Sir James William Barrett,  (27 February 1862 – 6 April 1945) was an Australian ophthalmologist and academic administrator.

Born in South Melbourne, Victoria, Australia, he was educated at the University of Melbourne and King's College London. He served as Vice-Chancellor of the University of Melbourne from 1931 to 1934, and then as Chancellor from 1935 to 1939. He was President of the British Medical Association from 1935 to 1936, and the inaugural president of the Victorian Town Planning and Parks Association, now the Town and Country Planning Association. He was a notable supporter of Jewish refugee migration to Australia by persons fleeing Nazism.

Bibliography
 The Australian medical corps in Egypt (1918)
 The twin ideals: An educated Commonwealth (1918)
 The war work of the Y.M.C.A. In Egypt (1919)
 A vision of the possible (1919)
 The diary of an Australian soldier (1921)
 Save Australia (1925)

References

1862 births
1945 deaths
University of Melbourne alumni
Alumni of King's College London
Australian Army officers
Australian military personnel of World War I
Vice-Chancellors of the University of Melbourne
Australian Knights Commander of the Order of the British Empire
Australian Companions of the Order of the Bath
Australian Companions of the Order of St Michael and St George
Presidents of the British Medical Association
People from South Melbourne
Medical doctors from Melbourne